= Total fertility rate in England by county / unitary authority =

Total fertility rate (TFR) by English local authority, 2024

This article lists the total fertility rate in England's counties or unitary authorities. In 2024, the fertility rate in England and Wales fell to 1.41, the lowest on record since records began in 1938.

The total fertility rate (TFR) is “the average number of live children a group of women would have if they experienced the age-specific fertility rates for the calendar year in question throughout their childbearing lifespan.”

== Total fertility rate by county ==
Figures below are for 2024 and cover England only (Welsh local authorities are excluded). Data are drawn from the ONS dataset Births in England and Wales: birth registrations (2024 edition) and correspond to the Total fertility rate (TFR) by local authority of usual residence of the mother.

Total fertility rate (TFR) by local authority, England, 2024
Local authority (England)	TFR (2024)
Luton	2.00
Barking and Dagenham	1.99
Slough	1.96
Sandwell	1.91
Oldham	1.90
Bradford	1.86
Pendle	1.82
Redbridge	1.81
Bolton	1.80
Walsall	1.80
Wolverhampton	1.80
Gravesham	1.79
Blackburn with Darwen	1.78
Birmingham	1.75
Boston	1.73
Harlow	1.73
Hyndburn	1.73
Stoke-on-Trent	1.72
Burnley	1.71
Rochdale	1.70
Hillingdon	1.69
Peterborough	1.69
Forest of Dean	1.68
Middlesbrough	1.68
Fenland	1.67
Swale	1.67
Brentwood	1.65
Harrow	1.64
Havering	1.64
Dartford	1.63
Bury	1.62
Kirklees	1.62
North Lincolnshire	1.62
Thurrock	1.62
Hounslow	1.61
North East Lincolnshire	1.61
Sevenoaks	1.61
Broxbourne	1.60
Doncaster	1.60
Dudley	1.60
East Staffordshire	1.60
Stockton-on-Tees	1.60
Tunbridge Wells	1.60
Central Bedfordshire	1.59
Dover	1.59
Elmbridge	1.59
Epping Forest	1.59
Maidstone	1.59
Ashford	1.58
Buckinghamshire	1.58
Croydon	1.58
Enfield	1.58
South Cambridgeshire	1.58
Watford	1.58
Bedford	1.57
Nuneaton and Bedworth	1.57
Rotherham	1.57
Tendring	1.57
Bassetlaw	1.56
Blackpool	1.56
Dacorum	1.56
Kingston upon Hull	1.56
Ipswich	1.56
King's Lynn and West Norfolk	1.56
Medway	1.56
Mid Devon	1.56
Vale of White Horse	1.56
Wealden	1.56
Breckland	1.55
Crawley	1.55
Darlington	1.55
Folkestone and Hythe	1.55
Rossendale	1.55
Tameside	1.55
Tandridge	1.55
Tewkesbury	1.55
Waltham Forest	1.55
Basildon	1.54
Cherwell	1.54
Derby	1.54
Mansfield	1.54
Newham	1.54
Spelthorne	1.54
Test Valley	1.54
Tonbridge and Malling	1.54
Barnet	1.53
Calderdale	1.53
Castle Point	1.53
East Hertfordshire	1.53
Herefordshire	1.53
Preston	1.53
Rochford	1.53
Telford and Wrekin	1.53
Uttlesford	1.53
Wakefield	1.53
Ashfield	1.52
Barnsley	1.52
Braintree	1.52
East Cambridgeshire	1.52
Gosport	1.52
North Northamptonshire	1.52
North Warwickshire	1.52
Rushmoor	1.52
South Derbyshire	1.52
Thanet	1.52
Havant	1.51
Mid Sussex	1.51
Milton Keynes	1.51
Runnymede	1.51
Solihull	1.51
Woking	1.51
Basingstoke and Deane	1.50
Brent	1.50
Redcar and Cleveland	1.50
South Oxfordshire	1.50
Southend-on-Sea	1.50
Wychavon	1.50
Wyre Forest	1.50
Babergh	1.49
Ealing	1.49
Hertsmere	1.49
Knowsley	1.49
Newark and Sherwood	1.49
Oadby and Wigston	1.49
West Northamptonshire	1.49
Reigate and Banstead	1.48
Rugby	1.48
Waverley	1.48
Amber Valley	1.47
Bracknell Forest	1.47
Lichfield	1.47
North East Derbyshire	1.47
North Yorkshire	1.47
Somerset	1.47
Stratford-on-Avon	1.47
Wigan	1.47
Fylde	1.46
Harborough	1.46
Malvern Hills	1.46
Swindon	1.46
Three Rivers	1.46
West Suffolk	1.46
Winchester	1.46
Wokingham	1.46
Bexley	1.45
Blaby	1.45
Bromley	1.45
Coventry	1.45
Gloucester	1.45
Halton	1.45
Horsham	1.45
Leicester	1.45
Melton	1.45
Mid Suffolk	1.45
North Devon	1.45
North Somerset	1.45
Ribble Valley	1.45
Rutland	1.45
St Albans	1.45
Wiltshire	1.45
Bolsover	1.44
Bromsgrove	1.44
Chichester	1.44
Colchester	1.44
East Lindsey	1.44
East Suffolk	1.44
Great Yarmouth	1.44
Hartlepool	1.44
Hastings	1.44
Redditch	1.44
South Norfolk	1.44
South Staffordshire	1.44
St Helens	1.44
Stockport	1.44
Torridge	1.44
Cheshire East	1.43
Cotswold	1.43
Cumberland	1.43
Gateshead	1.43
Huntingdonshire	1.43
South Holland	1.43
Stafford	1.43
Sunderland	1.43
West Berkshire	1.43
West Lancashire	1.43
Chelmsford	1.42
East Hampshire	1.42
Hart	1.42
Lewes	1.42
North Hertfordshire	1.42
Sefton	1.42
South Ribble	1.42
Tamworth	1.42
Windsor and Maidenhead	1.42
Chorley	1.41
Dorset	1.41
Mole Valley	1.41
Staffordshire Moorlands	1.41
Stevenage	1.41
Trafford	1.41
Wirral	1.41
Adur	1.40
Chesterfield	1.40
Eastleigh	1.40
High Peak	1.40
Northumberland	1.40
Rother	1.40
Shropshire	1.40
Sutton	1.40
West Devon	1.40
Cannock Chase	1.39
New Forest	1.39
West Oxfordshire	1.39
Wyre	1.39
East Devon	1.38
East Riding of Yorkshire	1.38
Surrey Heath	1.38
West Lindsey	1.38
Arun	1.37
Maldon	1.37
South Tyneside	1.37
Charnwood	1.36
Hinckley and Bosworth	1.36
North Norfolk	1.36
North Tyneside	1.36
South Kesteven	1.36
Stroud	1.36
Isle of Wight	1.35
Merton	1.35
Warrington	1.35
Eastbourne	1.34
Epsom and Ewell	1.34
Richmond upon Thames	1.34
Welwyn Hatfield	1.34
Hackney	1.33
Salford	1.33
South Gloucestershire	1.33
Gedling	1.32
Haringey	1.32
Lancaster	1.32
Manchester	1.32
North Kesteven	1.32
Cornwall and Isles of Scilly	1.31
County Durham	1.31
Greenwich	1.31
Newcastle-under-Lyme	1.31
Westmorland and Furness	1.31
Cheshire West and Chester	1.30
North West Leicestershire	1.30
Cheltenham	1.29
Erewash	1.29
Fareham	1.29
Guildford	1.29
Lewisham	1.29
Nottingham	1.29
Sheffield	1.29
South Hams	1.29
Teignbridge	1.29
Torbay	1.29
Warwick	1.29
Worthing	1.29
Broadland	1.28
Leeds	1.28
Reading	1.28
Worcester	1.28
Canterbury	1.25
Derbyshire Dales	1.25
Kingston upon Thames	1.25
Rushcliffe	1.25
Liverpool	1.24
Bournemouth, Christchurch and Poole	1.23
Plymouth	1.23
Portsmouth	1.23
Lincoln	1.22
Newcastle upon Tyne	1.21
Bath and North East Somerset	1.19
Broxtowe	1.19
Southampton	1.18
Tower Hamlets	1.18
Hammersmith and Fulham	1.16
Bristol	1.15
Lambeth	1.11
Wandsworth	1.10
Kensington and Chelsea	1.09
Oxford	1.08
Camden	1.05
Exeter	1.05
Norwich	1.05
Southwark	1.05
York	1.04
Westminster	1.00
Islington	0.99
Brighton and Hove	0.97
Cambridge	0.95
City of London	0.32

== Notes ==
- Figures are rounded to two decimal places, as presented in ONS outputs.
- Geographies reflect April 2023 local government reorganisations (e.g. Cumberland; Westmorland and Furness; North/West Northamptonshire; North Yorkshire).
